Often refers to two different reports by Sir Robert Francis: 
 Stafford Hospital scandal inquiry, report published in 2013
 Freedom to Speak Up Review, report published in 2015